Azeez Kayode Fakeye (born 1965), is a Nigerian sculptor.

Biography  
Azeez Kayode Fakeye was born in 1965 in Ibadan, Nigeria. The Fakeye family is a multigenerational group of Yoruba sculptors, and he is related to Lamidi Fakeye, Akin Fakeye, and Lukman Alade Fakeye.

References

External links 
http://www.grainsofafrica.com/
https://web.archive.org/web/20070721002655/http://www.grainsofafrica.com/catalog/index.php?cPath=36_38 
http://www.folkcuba.com/botanica_ht/fakeye_hmpge1.html 
http://grains-of-africa.blogspot.com/2008/09/traditional-modern-yoruba-art-fakeye.html 

1965 births
Living people
Nigerian sculptors
People from Ibadan